TSCO may refer to:
Tesco (LSE: TSCO), British retail chain
Tractor Supply Company (Nasdaq: TSCO), American retail chain
TSCO Racing, a builder of trophy trucks